West Harlsey is a hamlet and civil parish in the Hambleton district of North Yorkshire, England. The population as taken at the 2011 Census was less than 100. Details are included in the civil parish of Winton, Stank and Hallikeld. It is situated near the A19 road, 3 miles north east of Northallerton.

Further reading
http://www.gatehouse-gazetteer.info/English%20sites/2083.html
http://www.yorkshiremoors.co.uk/gazetteer/harlsey_castle.html

References

Villages in North Yorkshire
Civil parishes in North Yorkshire